{{DISPLAYTITLE:C8H7N}}
The molecular formula C8H7N (molar mass: 117.15 g/mol, exact mass: 117.0578 u) may refer to:

 Benzyl cyanide (BnCN)
 Indole
 Indolizine
 Isoindole

Molecular formulas